Carlos Calderón may refer to:

 Carlos Calderón (boxer) (born 1955), Puerto Rican boxer
 Carlos Calderón (fencer) (born 1947), Mexican Olympic fencer
 Carlos Calderón (Ecuadorian footballer) (born 1959), Ecuadorian footballer and manager
 Carlos Calderón (Mexican footballer) (1934–2012), Mexican footballer
 Carlos Calderón (Salvadoran footballer) (born 1986), Salvadoran footballer
 Carlos Calderón (Spanish footballer) (born 1995), Spanish footballer
 Carlos Calderón Fajardo (1946–2015), Peruvian journalist